The Accounting Professional & Ethical Standards Board (APESB) is an independent, national body that sets out the code of ethics and professional standards with which accounting professionals who are members of CPA Australia, Institute of Chartered Accountants or Institute of Public Accountants must comply.

Organization and mandate

The APESB was established by CPA Australia and the Institute of Chartered Accountants in Australia in February 2006, and later that year the National Institute of Accountants (now called the Institute of Public Accountants) became the third member of the APESB.  The three organizations jointly fund the APESB. Members of these three major Australian accounting bodies have a responsibility to act in the public interest. They are expected to act with objectivity and integrity in their dealings with investors, governments, clients, employers and employees.

Governance

The Accounting Professional & Ethical Standards Board (APESB) corporate structure is one of a company limited by guarantee. The role, structure and responsibilities of the Board of Directors is outlined in the Board Charter.

Relationship to international standards

Where relevant, APESB has adopted appropriate professional and ethical standards issued by a standard setting board of the International Federation of Accountants (IFAC). Whilst the applicable APESB standards remain consistent with IFAC standards, additional requirements or guidance may be included, taking into consideration the Australian environment.
The 2006 version of the Code of Ethics for Professional Accountants was based on the code issued by the International Ethics Standards Board for Accountants (IESBA) of the IFAC, but some provisions were amended to align with Australian legislation. When a revised version of the Code of Ethics was issued in December 2010, reflecting changes to the IESBA code issued in July 2009, the specific Australian requirements were omitted, replaced with a warning that accountants were also required to comply with legislation such as the Corporations Act 2001.
The APESB contributes to development of international standards through submissions to the IESBA and as a member of the IESBA National Standards Setters group.

Activities

APESB develops new and revised standards, taking into consideration market and stakeholder needs. APESB follows a rigorous process in developing professional and ethical standards, based on a well-documented process, which is available at: https://web.archive.org/web/20140126043225/http://apesb.org.au/uploads/apesb-work-programs/revised-due-process-dec-2013-final.pdf. Additionally, APESB takes a proactive approach to review each professional pronouncement six months after its initial commencement date and annually thereafter, to ensure each standard remains up to date and relevant. Stakeholders provide input to these review processes by reporting them to APESB via the online issues register on APESB’s website.

References

Accounting organizations
Accounting in Australia